"6 Kiss" is a song by American rapper Trippie Redd featuring fellow  American rappers Juice Wrld and YNW Melly. It was released from as a track from the former's Redd's fourth commercial mixtape A Love Letter to You 4 on November 22, 2019. The song was written alongside producers Nick Mira and Taz Taylor.

Composition
The song features a "slow-paced" beat. It opens with crooning from Juice Wrld, who sings the first verse. The next two verses are performed by YNW Melly and Trippie Redd respectively.

Critical reception
Alex Zidel of HotNewHipHop praised the song, writing, "This is one of the better songs from Redd's new album and, to be completely honest, it might be one of the smoothest cuts he's ever released."

Ryan Feyre of RapReviews gave a critical review of the song, describing it as one which Trippie Redd is "less enjoyable" and calling it "awkward". He went on to write, "Juice WRLD and YMW Melly do their best to illustrate the "666" life without first taking into account the implications for what they're saying. It's especially cringe-worthy when the one who's incarcerated is still talking about murder. The whole thing is a weird tonal switch-up that feels like a throwaway."

Charts

Certifications

References

2019 songs
Trippie Redd songs
Juice Wrld songs
YNW Melly songs
Song recordings produced by Taz Taylor (record producer)
Songs written by Trippie Redd
Songs written by Juice Wrld
Songs written by Nick Mira
Songs written by Taz Taylor (record producer)